Maarten Atmodikoro (born 4 February 1971 in Paramaribo, Suriname) is a retired Dutch football defender.

Club career
He started his professional career in the 1989/1990 season for Schiedamse Voetbal Vereniging. He later played for Dordrecht '90 (when SVV and FC Dordrecht merged in 1991), NAC Breda, NEC Nijmegen before finishing his career at ADO Den Haag. He retired in 2001.

Atmodikoro was sentenced to 7 months in jail in 1998 for rejecting to fulfill his army service.

References

External links
  Profile

1971 births
Living people
Sportspeople from Paramaribo
Dutch footballers
Surinamese emigrants to the Netherlands
Surinamese people of Javanese descent
Association football defenders
Dutch people of Javanese descent
SV SVV players
FC Dordrecht players
NAC Breda players
NEC Nijmegen players
ADO Den Haag players
Eredivisie players
Eerste Divisie players